The Ohio State University Press is the university press of Ohio State University. It was founded in 1957.

The OSU Press has published approximately 1700 books since its inception. The current director is Tony Sanfilippo, who had previously worked for over 14 years at the Penn State University Press. OSU Press's book A Mother's Tale, by Phillip Lopate, was widely reviewed by national media in 2017. How to Make a Slave was a finalist for the National Book Award in nonfiction in 2020.

Series/imprints
Series/imprints by OSU press include:

Latinographix
Latinographix was founded in 2017 as an imprint to publish graphic fiction and nonfiction narratives by Latino creators, and satirical studies such as Drawing on Anger: Portraits of U.S. Hypocrisy by Eric J. Garcia.  The series also publishes graphic novels on pressing social justice issues, such as sexual abuse and homelessness in Mexico (such as Angelitos by Santiago Cohen and Ilan Stavans), as well as children's books for young people of color (such as Chupacabra Charlie by Frederick Luis Aldama).

Others

21st Century Essays
Abnormativities
The Academy for Leadership and Governance
Classical Memories/Modern Identities
Cognitive Approaches to Culture
Formations
Global Latin/o Americas
Interventions
Intersectional Rhetorics
The Journal Charles B. Wheeler Poetry Prize
The Journal Non/Fiction Prize
Machete
New Directions in Rhetoric and Materiality
New Suns
Race and Mediated Cultures
Studies in Cartoons and Comics
Theory and Interpretation of Narrative
Mad Creek Books
Trillium

See also

 List of English-language book publishing companies
 List of university presses

References

External links
Ohio State University Press

Press
University presses of the United States
Publishing companies established in 1957
Book publishing companies based in Ohio
American companies established in 1957